Kevin M. Harris (born October 24, 1981) is an American politician who is a member of the Maryland House of Delegates for District 27A in Charles and Prince George's County, Maryland. He was previously a candidate for District 9 of the Prince George's County Council in 2018.

Background
Harris graduated from St. Benedict's Preparatory School in 1999, and served in the United States Navy until 2009. He later graduated from Washington Bible College with a Bachelor of Arts degree in general studies in 2011, and Walden University with a Master of Science degree in leadership development in 2014. Since 2011, he has worked at Fort Meade.

In 2018, Harris ran for the Prince George's County Council in District 9, seeking to succeed councilmember Mel Franklin, who was running for the at-large seat on the council. He came in third-to-last-place in the Democratic primary, receiving only 4.8 percent of the vote.

In 2022, Harris ran for the Maryland House of Delegates in District 27A, challenging incumbent Susie Proctor. Harris defeated Proctor in the Democratic primary with 55.9 percent of the vote. He was unopposed in the general election.

In the legislature
Harris was sworn into the Maryland House of Delegates on January 11, 2023. He is a member of the House Appropriations Committee.

Personal life

Decorations and badges 
Harris' decorations and medals include:

Electoral history

References

External links
 

21st-century African-American politicians
21st-century American politicians
African-American state legislators in Maryland
African-American men in politics
Democratic Party members of the Maryland House of Delegates
Living people
Military personnel from Maryland
Walden University alumni
1981 births